Fejervarya orissaensis (common name: Orissa frog) is a species of frog that is endemic to Orissa state in eastern India. Similar frogs, however, have been found in southwestern Thailand, and it is possible that Fejervarya orissaensis exists as a single species or cryptic species complex all way from Orissa through Myanmar to Thailand.

Fejervarya orissaensis is common and widely distributed in Orissa in eastern India. It has been recorded at elevations between 100 and 500m and is generally associated with grasslands and agricultural areas. There is little information available on breeding biology or larval ecology.

References

Fejervarya
Frogs of India
Endemic fauna of India
Amphibians described in 1997